Septa closeli is a species of predatory sea snail, a marine gastropod mollusk in the family Cymatiidae.

Description

Distribution

References

 Steyn, D.G. & Lussi, M. (1998) Marine Shells of South Africa. An Illustrated Collector’s Guide to Beached Shells. Ekogilde Publishers, Hartebeespoort, South Africa, ii + 264 pp. page(s): 76

Cymatiidae
Gastropods described in 1987